Higor Barbosa Rodrigues Leite, better known as Higor or Higor Leite,  is a Brazilian footballer who plays as a midfielder.

Career
On 3 February 2021, Higor signed for Armenian Premier League club FC Pyunik. On 1 June 2022, Higor left Pyunik after his contract expired.

Honours
Pyunik
 Armenian Premier League: 2021–22

References

Living people
1993 births
Brazilian footballers
Association football midfielders
Fluminense FC players
Avaí FC players
Criciúma Esporte Clube players
Volta Redonda FC players
Goiás Esporte Clube players
ABC Futebol Clube players
Londrina Esporte Clube players
Paraná Clube players
Grêmio Novorizontino players
FC Pyunik players
Campeonato Brasileiro Série A players
Campeonato Brasileiro Série B players
Campeonato Brasileiro Série C players
Botafogo Futebol Clube (PB) players
Armenian Premier League players